Bruno Lopes (born 9 February 1966), better known as Kool Shen, is a French rapper, actor and producer, with Portuguese and Breton origins. He is also a break dancer and a graffiti artist. He is a co-founder of Suprême NTM and one of the major figures of French rap. He was featured on Enhancer's album Electrochoc in the song "Hot".

Olympique Lyonnais shirt 
On 2 November 2009, it was announced by French football club Olympique Lyonnais (OL), in collaboration with Betclic and Universal Music, that Kool Shen's name would feature on the team's shirt in a match against league rivals Olympique de Marseille (OM) the following week. It was the first time that a musical artist's album was promoted on a football shirt. OL and OM went on to play out a memorable 5–5 draw in the match.

Discography 
 Dernier round (2005)
 Kool Shen – Live (2005)
 Crise de conscience (2009)
 Sur le fil du rasoir (2016)

Music videos

 1998 : "That's my people".
 2000 : "United we stand" (feat Toy). Directed by J.G Biggs
 2002 : "Are You Ready?" (feat Toy). Directed by J.G Biggs
 2004 : "Qui suis-je?" (actors: Samuel Le Bihan & Jo Prestia). Directed by J.G Biggs.
 2004 : "II shoot IV my people" (feat Big Ali) Directed by J.G Biggs.
 2004 : "Un ange dans le ciel". Directed by J.G Biggs.
 2005 : "L'avenir est à nous" (feat Rohff  & Dadoo). (actor: Tchéky Karyo) Directed by J.G Biggs.
 2005 : "That's my people (live)" (feat Sinik & Kery James) Directed by J.G Biggs.
 2006 : "HOT" (with Enhancer & David Banner) Directed by HK corp.
 2009 : "J'reviens" (feat JoeyStarr) (Actor : Philippe Nahon)
 2009 : "C'est bouillant" (with Salif)

Filmography

References

External links 
 Official Site
 

1967 births
Living people
French rappers
French people of Breton descent
French people of Portuguese descent
People from Saint-Denis, Seine-Saint-Denis
Rappers from Seine-Saint-Denis
French poker players
French male film actors
21st-century French male actors